SAPD may refer to:

 San Antonio Police Department
 Socialist Workers' Party of Germany
 Studies in American Political Development